Aharak is a village in Pindra Tehsil of Varanasi district in the Indian state of Uttar Pradesh. Aharak has its own gram panchayat by the same name as the village. The village is about 19 kilometers North-West of Varanasi city, 274 kilometers South-East of state capital Lucknow and 805 kilometers South-East of the national capital Delhi.

Demography
Aharak has a total population of 1,152 people amongst 139 families. Sex ratio of Aharak is 949 and child sex ratio is 1,000. Uttar Pradesh state average for both ratios is 912 and 902 respectively.

Transportation
Aharak can be accessed by road and does not have a railway station of its own. Closest railway station to this village is Birapatti railway station (6.2 kilometers South-East). Nearest operational airports are Varanasi airport (6.7 kilometers North-West) and Allahabad Airports (143 kilometers West).

See also

Pindra Tehsil
Varanasi district

Notes
  All demographic data is based on 2011 Census of India.

References 

Villages in Varanasi district